el-Shennawi (also transliterated as al-Shinnawi) is an Arabic family name, when followed by a sun letter, the l in el assimilates to the initial consonant of the following noun, resulting in a doubled consonant.

People
 Abu'l-Mawahib al-Shinnawi, Muslim scholar
 Kamal el-Shennawi, Egyptian actor
 Tarek El Shennawi, Egyptian film critic

Arabic-language surnames